Wang Ziming (born 5 August 1996) is a Chinese footballer who currently plays for Chinese Super League side Beijing Sinobo Guoan.

Club career
Wang Ziming joined Qingdao Jonoon's youth academy in 2010 when Qingdao Hailifeng was dissolved due to match-fixing. He was promoted to Qingdao Jonoon's first team squad in the summer of 2014. He made his senior debut on 4 October 2014 in a 1–1 home draw against Yanbian FC, coming on as a substitute for Cristian Dănălache in the 73rd minute. On 25 September 2016, he scored his first senior goal in a 1–0 win over Hunan Billows.

On 14 July 2017, Wang transferred to Chinese Super League side Beijing Sinobo Guoan with a five-year contract. He was then loan back to Qingdao Jonoon for the rest of the 2017 season. Wang returned to Beijing Guoan in January 2018. On 4 March 2018, he made his debut for the club in a 3–0 away defeat against Shandong Luneng Taishan, coming on for Jonathan Soriano in the 84th minute.

He became a regular feature in the Guoan lineup in the 2019 season, featuring a total of 25 times and scoring 7 goals. He was favored by Roger Schmidt and was caped consistently from matchday 12 to matchday 19 in Guoan's Chinese Super League campaign. His performance earned him a spot in the Chinese national team. However, he briefly fell out of favor under Bruno Génésio, who replaced Schmidt toward the later half of the season. Wang eventually earned his way back to the match squad and scored twice as substitute in the last four games of the season. Wang was considered a lucky charm for the team by the Chinese media as four of his seven goals were scored after the 88th minute.

International career
He made his debut for China national football team on 7 June 2019 in an friendly against Philippines, as an 80th-minute substitute for Yang Xu.

Career statistics

Club statistics
.

International statistics
.

References

External links
 
 

1996 births
Living people
Chinese footballers
China international footballers
Footballers from Qingdao
Qingdao Hainiu F.C. (1990) players
Beijing Guoan F.C. players
Chinese Super League players
China League One players
China League Two players
Association football forwards